Haydn Robins (born 9 August 1972) is a former Australian rules footballer who played with Melbourne and Richmond in the Australian Football League (AFL).

After winning the Melbourne reserves best and fairest award in 1991, the Ringwood recruit broke into the Melbourne seniors for the first time in round nine of the 1992 AFL season. He made a total of 20 appearances for Melbourne over two seasons, then made his way to Richmond, via the 1994 Pre-Season Draft. A defender, he played just four senior games for Richmond.

In 1995 Robins played for Woodville-West Torrens in the South Australian National Football League (SANFL)  before returning to Victoria to play for Victorian Football League (VFL) club Sandringham, Ringwood and Somerville. He joined Beaconsfield Football Club in 2009, moving from the back pocket to full forward, kicking over 100 goals in his first year at the club, which led Beaconsfield to win their first premiership in 20 years. An exponent of the speccy, and with his greased back hair and gloves, Robins became the most watched player in the competition. 

Robins played in three more premierships with the club and kick over 100 goals one more time. He coached Beaconsfield in 2006 and 2007, but he couldn't replicate his on-field success as a coach. 

Robins coached Paynesville in the East Gippsland Football League (EGFL) in 2009 and 2010.

References

1972 births
Living people
Australian rules footballers from Victoria (Australia)
Melbourne Football Club players
Richmond Football Club players
Woodville-West Torrens Football Club players
Sandringham Football Club players